Gertrúd Stefanek (born 5 July 1959, Ózd, Hungary) is a Hungarian fencer, who won two Olympic medals in the foil team competitions, in 1980 in Moscow and 1988 in Seoul.

References

1959 births
Living people
Hungarian female foil fencers
Fencers at the 1980 Summer Olympics
Fencers at the 1988 Summer Olympics
Fencers at the 1992 Summer Olympics
Olympic fencers of Hungary
Olympic bronze medalists for Hungary
Olympic medalists in fencing
Medalists at the 1980 Summer Olympics
Medalists at the 1988 Summer Olympics
People from Ózd
Sportspeople from Borsod-Abaúj-Zemplén County
20th-century Hungarian women